Bamanbore is a town in Surendranagar district of Gujarat, India.

Geography

Location
National Highway 8B ends at Bamanbore. Nearest airport is Rajkot Airport.

References

External links
 About Bamanbore
 Satellite map of Bamanbore

Cities and towns in Surendranagar district